Ali Abu al-Ragheb (born 1946) was the 33rd Prime Minister of Jordan from 19 June 2000 until 25 October 2003. He resigned and was replaced by Faisal al-Fayez.

Prime Minister Ali Abu Ragheb was born in Amman, Jordan in 1946. He obtained his BSc in Civil Engineering in 1967 from the University of Tennessee in the United States.

Abu al-Ragheb was partner and managing director of National Engineering and Contracting Co from 1971-1991. He later served as Minister of Industry and Trade in 1991 and in 1995. He was also appointed as Minister of Energy and Mineral Resources in 1991-1993 and was elected to the Jordanian parliament in 1993. Abu Ragheb was appointed Prime Minister and Minister of Defense on 19 June 2000.

Abu al-Ragheb's name was published in the Panama Papers that were released in early April 2016 by the International Consortium of Investigative Journalists (ICIJ).

Decorations
 Grand Cordon of the Order of the Star of Jordan Al-Kawkab Al-Urduni
 Grand Cordon of the Order of Al-Nahda in Jordan
 Knight Grand Cross of the Order of Merit of the Italian Republic
 Knight Grand Cross of the Order of St Michael and St George (GCMG) in Britain.

See also 
 List of prime ministers of Jordan

References

External links
 Prime Ministry of Jordan website

1946 births
Living people
Prime Ministers of Jordan
Members of the House of Representatives (Jordan)
University of Tennessee alumni
Government ministers of Jordan
Industry ministers of Jordan
Defence ministers of Jordan
Trade ministers of Jordan
Energy ministers of Jordan
Members of the Senate of Jordan
Knights Grand Cross of the Order of Merit of the Italian Republic
Honorary Knights Grand Cross of the Order of St Michael and St George
Jordanian people of Palestinian descent
People named in the Panama Papers